TR3 Racing is an American sports car racing team that currently competes in the IMSA SportsCar Championship, GT World Challenge America, and Lamborghini Super Trofeo North America.

History
TR3 Racing was founded in 2015 as the motorsports arm of TR3 Performance, an aftermarket tuning operation based out of South Florida.

GT World Challenge America
In 2017, the team began competing in the Pirelli World Challenge, fielding a Ferrari 488 GT3 for Daniel Mancinelli. Entering the Pro class, Mancinelli was paired with co-drivers Andrea Montermini and Niccolò Schirò for the SprintX events. Claiming three victories and five overall podiums, Mancinelli finished fourth in the overall GT-class championship. TR3 returned in 2018, alternating their Sprint and SprintX lineups. Wei Lu and Jeff Segal piloted the team's Ferrari in the longer SprintX events, while Mancinelli continued in his solo-driver duties for the other half of the season. However, Mancinelli would miss the opening round at St. Petersburg, as the team withdrew citing unfavorable BoP. TR3 had entered the updated 2018 model, which received a 20 kilogram weight increase over the 2017 edition of the 488 GT3. Although team principal Gregory Romanelli threatened to pull the entry from additional events later in the year, both TR3 cars completed the entire 2018 season in their respective championships. Mancinelli's one win, at Long Beach, and four podiums were the team's only podium finishes of the season. TR3 also began collaborating with Squadra Corse Garage Italia, as the latter's driver lineup of Caesar Bacarella and Martin Fuentes claimed the GTA class championship in both Sprint and SprintX competition.

For 2019, the team continued their partnership with Squadra Corse Garage Italia, fielding a pair of entries in the rebranded GT World Challenge America. The TR3-branded entry secured one class victory in the four races it entered, taking the Pro-Am Cup victory in the first race at Circuit of the Americas. The Squadra Corse-branded entry, piloted by Martin Fuentes, claimed the Am-class title.

IMSA SportsCar Championship
For the 2022 24 Hours of Daytona, TR3 fielded Lamborghini's sole GTD Pro-class entry, receiving full factory support from the Italian marque. The #63 entry was piloted by Mirko Bortolotti, Andrea Caldarelli, Marco Mapelli, and Rolf Ineichen. The entry would take pole through a class victory in the 100-minute qualifying race, but would retire from the 24-hour event and finish 12th in GTD Pro. The team would return to the GTD Pro class for the 2022 12 Hours of Sebring, finishing second in class.

References 

American auto racing teams
WeatherTech SportsCar Championship teams
Auto racing teams established in 2015